Maurice Harron (born 1946) is an artist, educator and public sculptor from Derry, Northern Ireland. He was educated at St Columb's College and at the Ulster College of Art and Design in Belfast.

He has completed dozens of monuments in Ireland, the UK and in the USA.  Notable commissions include Reconciliation/Hands Across the Divide in Carlisle Square, Derry, Let the Dance Begin in Strabane, the Irish Famine Memorial on Cambridge Common, Cambridge, Massachusetts, Red Hugh O'Donnell in Roscommon, Grainne in Heritage Green park, Chicago and CS Lewis Square in Belfast.

References
Maurice Harron website
Let the Dance Begin
Irish Famine Memorial, Cambridge, MA
Grainne, Chicago 
CS Lewis Square opening 
Josef Locke sculpture, Derry

External links

www.mauriceharron.net 

Sculptors from Northern Ireland
Artists from Derry (city)
1946 births
Living people
Alumni of Ulster University